"Like a Rock" is a song written by American singer-songwriter Bob Seger. The single peaked at No. 1 on the US Billboard Mainstream Rock Tracks.

Background and writing
Seger told the New York Times that the song "was inspired partly by the end of a relationship that had lasted for 11 years. You wonder where all that time went. But beyond that, it expresses my feeling that the best years of your life are in your late teens when you have no special commitments and no career. It's your last blast of fun before heading into the cruel world."

Reception
Cash Box called it an "emotional ballad of perseverence and commitment."  Billboard called it a "slow-paced, rough-edged ballad [that] mourns the certainties of youth."

Classic Rock History critic Janey Roberts rated it as Seger's 10th best song.

Personnel
Credits are adapted from the liner notes of Like a Rock.
Bob Seger – lead vocals

The Silver Bullet Band
Chris Campbell – bass
Craig Frost – organ

Additional musicians
Dawayne Bailey – acoustic guitar
Douglas Kibble – background vocals
Russ Kunkel – drums
Bill Payne – piano
Rick Vito – slide guitar
The Weather Girls (Izora Armstead and Martha Wash) – background vocals

Chart performance

In media
This song's greatest exposure was in Chevrolet truck television advertisements from 1991 until 2004, for their massively successful "Like a Rock" campaign.  Chevrolet originally wanted to use Bruce Springsteen's "Born in the U.S.A." for the ad campaign but when Springsteen declined "Like a Rock" was chosen.

The song and aforementioned advertisement campaign was parodied as "Tastes Like Liberty" for Krusty Burger's Ribwich in The Simpsons episode "I'm Spelling as Fast as I Can".

The song was also featured in the 2005 film The Weather Man, starring Nicolas Cage and Michael Caine.

"Livin' Inside My Heart"
The b-side of some versions of the "Like a Rock" single was "Livin' Inside My Heart."  Seger said of "Livin' Inside My Heart:

See also 
List of number-one mainstream rock hits (United States)

References

External links

1986 singles
Bob Seger songs
Songs written by Bob Seger
Rock ballads
Songs used as jingles
Chevrolet
Capitol Records singles
Song recordings produced by Bob Seger
Song recordings produced by Punch Andrews